Heinrich Jakob Aldenrath (17 February 1775, Lübeck – 25 February 1844, Hamburg) was a portrait painter,  miniaturist, and  lithographer.

Life
Aldenrath was a pupil of Johann Jakob Tischbein and of Friedrich Carl Gröger, with whom he developed a friendship which lasted until Gröger's death in 1838. Together they attended the academies of Berlin, Dresden, and Paris. After periods in Lübeck, Kiel, and Copenhagen, they finally settled at Hamburg in 1814, and became celebrated as portrait painters. Aldenrath died in Hamburg in 1844. It is said that he painted the portrait of the King of Denmark no less than thirteen times.

His lithographs include portraits of  Friedrich Karl Gröger, the poets Klopstock and  Count Stolberg, Adolphus, Duke of Cambridge, and his own self-portrait.

See also
 List of German painters

References
 

18th-century German painters
18th-century German male artists
German male painters
19th-century German painters
19th-century German male artists
1775 births
1844 deaths
Artists from Lübeck